Tim Kehoe (May 11, 1970 – February 27, 2014) was an author and toy inventor from St. Paul, Minnesota.  He invented numerous toys, and was perhaps best known for inventing non-staining colored bubbles, Zubbles. Zubbles took more than 14 years to develop and incorporated a great deal of research in various fields, including chemistry and the science of dyeing. Kehoe died unexpectedly at the age of 43 in 2014.

Author
Kehoe was the author of the Vincent Shadow series published by Little, Brown and Company. Eleven-year-old Vincent Shadow dreamed of being a toy inventor. He had notebooks full of ideas: bubbles that carried sound, rockets that pop into kites, and a football that would rather bite than be caught. Unfortunately, the secret attic lab where Vincent built his prototypes had seen more disasters than triumphs. But a chance encounter with eccentric toy inventor Howard G. Whiz, and the discovery of long-lost inventions by one of the world's greatest scientists would change Vincent's life forever.

Kehoe also authored the forthcoming middle-grade thriller Furious Jones and the Assassin's Secret. Furious Jones’s dad is a world-famous thriller writer, an all around Hemingway-esque tough-guy. His dad was brutally murdered onstage one week before the release of his latest book. Furious had a front row seat to the killing. Now an orphan, Furious is set to inherit a small fortune and massive trouble. But, after spending time with a secret copy of his dad’s soon-to-be-released book, Furious decides to stop running and start chasing.

Books
The Unusual Mind of Vincent Shadow, 11/01/2009, Little, Brown, and Company
Vincent Shadow: Toy Inventor, 8/03/2011, Little, Brown, and Company
Vincent Shadow: The Top Secret Toys, 11/02/2011, Little, Brown, and Company
Furious Jones and the Assassin's Secret, Coming spring 2014, Simon & Schuster

Awards 
 2005 Popular Science Grand Prize for Innovation
 2006 One of America’s 100 Best by Reader's Digest
 2006 'Forty Under 40' winner by the Business Journal
 2008 'Pick of the Lists' choices at the Midwest Booksellers Association Fall Trade Show
 2011 North Carolina Children's Book Award Nominee

References 

 The Believer interview, May 2007
 Startup Nation
 Morning Edition interview, December 22, 2005
  Shelf Awareness, September 29, 2008
  2011 North Carolina Children's Book Award Winners

External links
 Tim Kehoe's web site (archived)
 Vincent Shadow web site (archived)
 Zubbles home page (archived)

1970 births
2014 deaths
Writers from Saint Paul, Minnesota
Toy inventors